Biff Elliot (born Leon Shalek; July 26, 1923 – August 15, 2012) was an American actor. He is perhaps best known for his role as popular detective Mike Hammer in the 1953 version of I, the Jury and for his guest appearance as Schmitter in the Star Trek episode "The Devil in the Dark".

Personal life

Biff Elliot was born Leon Shalek in Lynn, Massachusetts, the son of Susan (née Bernstein) and Israel Shalek. He was the youngest of three brothers and his ancestors were Jewish immigrants from Eastern Europe. His father opened a burlap bag-manufacturing business in Presque Isle, Maine. His eldest brother, Irwin Elliot Shalek (Win Elliot) was a popular radio and television host and sports commentator. His other brother Stanley was president of his father's business. 

Elliot took the nickname of Biff when he became involved with amateur Golden Glove boxing. After his mother learned of his fighting and canceled any further fights, Elliot played other sports, including track and football. 

While in college at the University of Maine, Elliot enlisted in the United States Army, serving in North Africa and Italy in the 34th Infantry Division during World War II. After the war, Elliot served six months of occupation duty and was shipped home, where he resumed his education at the University of Maine, graduating in 1948 with a degree in journalism. 

Elliot met his first wife Elizabeth (Betty) Dole at college, and she left after her sophomore year to marry him. They moved to New York City, where Betty worked as a high fashion model. 

Elliot worked steadily in films and television until his wife's death in 1974 at the age of 45. He married again in 1977 to Connie Bandy, and they remained married for 35 years until his death in 2012. 

He was the brother of Win Elliot, a longtime CBS Radio Network sportscaster and 1950s television game-show host.

Career
Elliot, who had acted during his college years, abandoned writing to pursue television roles. He appeared in many important dramatic shows of the time, mostly playing tough, working-class characters. When Elliot was spotted by a Hollywood attorney while performing in a television episode, the attorney recommended him to Victor Saville, the producer who was preparing the first film adaption of Mickey Spillane's I, the Jury. After securing the part following a 15-minute audition, Elliot was brought to Hollywood and prepared for the role by reading Mike Hammer novels, often spending the entire night reading them. I, the Jury became Elliot's first leading film role, and he was the first actor to portray the Mike Hammer character in a film. Although Elliot was signed to a long-term contract as Mike Hammer, other actors were later cast in the role.

In 2004 Elliot recorded a commentary track for I, the Jury.

Over the next few years, Elliot became a prominent fixture in war films of the 1950s and 1960s, appearing in Between Heaven and Hell, The Enemy Below, Pork Chop Hill and PT 109. In 1959, playwright Clifford Odets, who had noticed Elliot in I, the Jury,  offered him a role in The Story on Page One, which Odets wrote and directed. In the 1960s, Elliot appeared mostly in television, including appearance on Frank Lovejoy's detective series Meet McGraw and on Perry Mason. In 1961 Elliot played the part of Buddy Blue, a trumpeter on the run from a gangster, in the series 77 Sunset Strip.  In 1966, he portrayed a government agent in an episode of the comedy series The Dick Van Dyke Show. In 1967, he appeared in the Star Trek episode "The Devil in the Dark". He guest-starred in an episode of Gibbsville in 1976. In 1977, he had a memorable supporting role in Telly Savalas's Beyond Reason with Diana Muldaur. In 1974, Elliot costarred in two episodes of the Planet of the Apes series, playing an orangutan in one of them. Elliot make his final film appearance in the 1986 film That's Life!. His last appearance on television was in 1986 on the set of the television series of Starman. Elliot retired in 2001.

Retirement
After Elliot's retirement, he worked in radio sports, covering Los Angeles sports for the CBS Radio Network. 

Elliot died at his home in Studio City, California, on August 15, 2012, at the age of 89.

Partial filmography

I, the Jury (1953) - Mike Hammer
House of Bamboo (1955) - Webber
Good Morning, Miss Dove (1955) - Reverend Alex Burnham
Between Heaven and Hell (1956) - Tom Thumb - Co. G
The True Story of Jesse James (1957) - Jim Younger
The Enemy Below (1957) - Quartermaster
Torpedo Run (1958) - Lt. Paul Buckeye (uncredited)
Pork Chop Hill (1959) - Pvt. Boven
The Story on Page One (1959) - Eddie Ritter (uncredited)
PT 109 (1963) - Seaman Edgar E. Mauer
Combat!  (1963) episode: "The Party" as Rafferty
Brainstorm (1965) - Detective (uncredited)
Blood Bath (1966) - Cafe Manager
Destination Inner Space (1966) - Dr. Wilson
The Navy vs. the Night Monsters (1966) - Cmdr. Arthur Simpson
Combat!  (1966) episode: "The Outsider" as Doctor
The Girl Who Knew Too Much (1969) - Archie
The Day of the Wolves (1971) - The Inspector
The Hard Ride (1971) - Mike
Kotch (1971) - Motel Manager
Mission Impossible  (1972) episode: "Casino" as Mel Simpson
Cool Breeze (1972) - Lt. Carl Mager
Save the Tiger (1973) - Tiger Petitioner
This Is a Hijack (1973) - Neal Hanaford
The Front Page (1974) - Police Dispatcher
Planet of the Apes (TV series) (1974) episode: The Cure - OrangutanThe Wild McCullochs (1975) - RalphThe Dark (1979) - Detective Jack BreslerBeyond Reason (1985) - Police SergeantThat's Life!'' (1986) - Belmont

References

External links
 
 Official Website

 Obituary

1923 births
2012 deaths
Male actors from Massachusetts
American male film actors
United States Army personnel of World War II
American male television actors
Actors from Lynn, Massachusetts
University of Maine alumni
20th-century American male actors
Jewish American male actors
People from Studio City, Los Angeles
21st-century American Jews